Angela is an Italian surname. Notable people with the surname include:

 Alberto Angela (born 1962), Italian paleontologist, scientific popularizer, writer and journalist
 Carlo Angela (1875-1949), Italian doctor and Righteous Gentile
 Piero Angela (1928-2022), Italian Grand Officer OMRI, television host, science journalist, and pianist

See also

Angela (given name)
Angela (disambiguation)

References

Italian-language surnames